USS Bairoko (CVE-115) was a  of the United States Navy in service from 1945 to 1955.

History
Bairoko was named after the Battle of Bairoko, a battle over Bairoko Harbor – a small inlet on the north coast of New Georgia, Solomon Islands – which took place on 20 July 1943 between American and Japanese forces. Bairoko eventually was occupied by American forces on 26 August 1943.

Initially named Portage Bay, CVE-115 was renamed Bairoko 6 June 1944; launched 25 January 1945 by Todd-Pacific Shipyards, Inc., Tacoma, Washington; sponsored by Mrs. J. J. Ballentine, wife of Rear Admiral John J. Ballentine; and commissioned 16 July 1945, Captain H. B. Temple in command.

Operational history
Commissioned too late to take an active part in World War II, Bairoko engaged in peacetime fleet cruises, maneuvers, and exercises until December 1949. During the period she made two cruises to the Far East (18 October 1946 – 25 January 1947 and 18 February – 30 May 1947), and participated in the atomic bomb test at Eniwetok Atoll. On 16 December 1949 she reported to San Francisco for pre-inactivation overhaul and went out of commission in reserve 14 April 1950.

When the Korean War broke out Bairoko was immediately readied for active duty. She was recommissioned 12 September 1950 and reported to the Pacific Fleet. Between November 1950 and August 1953 she made three extended cruises to the Far East (14 November 1950– 15 August 1951, 1 December 1951 – 9 June 1952 and February–August 1953), acting in support of the United Nations Forces in Korea. Her planes flew hundreds of strikes against North Korean and "Chinese Volunteer" troops, installations, transportation facilities, and naval units. On 9 May 1951 she had five men killed and 13 injured by an explosion and flash fire in Japanese waters.

Returning to the west coast late in August 1953, Bairoko remained there until January 1954 when she departed to assist in the hydrogen bomb tests in the Eniwetok Bikini area. During the Castle Bravo test on 1 March 1954, sixteen crew members received beta radiation burns. From May through June 1954 she operated out of San Diego on training exercises. In July 1954 she reported to Long Beach Naval Shipyard to commence pre-inactivation overhaul and went out of commission in reserve at San Francisco 18 February 1955. Bairoko was stricken for disposal on 1 April 1960 and scrapped at Hong Kong in 1961.

Bairoko received three battle stars for her Korean service.

References 

Commencement Bay-class escort carriers
1945 ships
Cold War escort carriers of the United States
Korean War escort carriers of the United States
Korean War aircraft carriers of the United States
Maritime incidents in 1954